Gnomonia is a genus of fungi in the family Gnomoniaceae.

The genus contains as estimated 60 species including:
Gnomonia alnea
Gnomonia borealis
Gnomonia caryae
Gnomonia comari
Gnomonia dispora
Gnomonia fructicola
Gnomonia iliau
Gnomonia leptostyla
Gnomonia nerviseda
Gnomonia rubi
Gnomonia tithymalina
Gnomonia vulgaris

References

Gnomoniaceae
Sordariomycetes genera
Taxa named by Giuseppe De Notaris